
Gmina Świdnica is a rural gmina (administrative district) in Świdnica County, Lower Silesian Voivodeship, in south-western Poland. Its seat is the town of Świdnica, although the town is not part of the territory of the gmina.

Neighbouring gminas
Gmina Świdnica is bordered by the gminas of Dzierżoniów, Jaworzyna Śląska, Marcinowice, Walim and Żarów.

Villages
The gmina contains the villages of Bojanice, Boleścin, Burkatów, Bystrzyca Dolna, Bystrzyca Górna, Gogołów, Grodziszcze, Jagodnik, Jakubów, Komorów, Krzczonów, Krzyżowa, Lubachów, Lutomia Dolna, Lutomia Górna, Lutomia Mała, Makowice, Miłochów, Modliszów, Mokrzeszów, Niegoszów, Opoczka, Panków, Pogorzała, Pszenno, Słotwina, Stachowice, Stachowiczki, Sulisławice, Wieruszów, Wilków, Wiśniowa, Witoszów Dolny, Witoszów Górny, Zawiszów and Złoty Las.

Twin towns – sister cities

Gmina Świdnica is twinned with:

 Ermont, France
 Lampertheim, Germany
 Maldegem, Belgium
 Zviahel, Ukraine
 Żukowo, Poland

References

Swidnica
Świdnica County